Kirik Party is a 2016 Indian Kannada-language romantic comedy film directed by Rishab Shetty and produced by G. S. Guptha and Rakshit Shetty. It stars Rakshit Shetty, Rashmika Mandanna, Samyuktha Hegde, and Achyuth Kumar while Aravinnd Iyer, Dhananjay Ranjan, Chandan Achar and Pramod Shetty play prominent roles. Rakshit Shetty wrote the story and also co-wrote the script along with a team The Seven odds (which consisted of Rakshit Shetty, Rishab Shetty, Abhijith Mahesh, Dhananjay Ranjan, Kiranraj K, Chandrajith Belliappa).

This film marks the second directorial venture of Rishab Shetty after Ricky (2016), and also marks the film debut of Mandanna and Hegde. The principal photography commenced on 17 April 2016 at Malnad College of Engineering in Hassan and was completed in September 2016. Karm Chawla and Sachin Ravi performed the cinematography and editing respectively. The film's soundtrack features music composed by B. Ajaneesh Loknath, which received mostly positive response from audience, and became viral upon its release.

The film released worldwide on 30 December 2016 to positive response from critics. It became one of the highest grossing Kannada film all time and celebrated 250-days in over 15 theatres and also completed 365-days in multiplexes. It won the Karnataka State Film Award for Best Family Entertainer, and was nominated in seven categories at the 64th Filmfare Awards South, winning five of them. It also received five awards at the IIFA Utsavam and seven awards at the 6th South Indian International Movie Awards. The film was remade in Telugu as Kirrak Party.

Synopsis

Kirik Party is the story of a gang of mischievous students, led by the protagonist Karna (Rakshit Shetty), who has just joined an engineering college. They belong to different streams of engineering but develop a bond while staying together in the hostel. Karna, the protagonist from a small town has joined this engineering college as a mechanical engineering student and he gangs up with his hostel mates Loki, Alexander, Manja and others to cause a lot of mischief in the college. During the first year he befriends Saanvi (Rashmika Mandanna) a Final year student and certain incidents impact Karna's life making him question his very basic thought process.

The second half starts with the fun-loving girl Arya (Samyuktha Hegde), who is a student of first year Electrical engineering in the same college and falls in love with final year Mechanical engineering student Karna (Rakshith Shetty) at the end both start to love each other.

The progression of Karna and the gang from being a bunch of mischief makers to responsible adults is the theme of Kirik Party. It is a fun-filled film with lots of melodious songs.

Plot

The story starts with a song introducing the characters of the film. Karna a first-year student meets Saanvi final year student and daughter of a police officer. Everyone in the campus likes Saanvi and even Karna's friend. But Saanvi gets close to Karna and they both become good friends. Saanvi is a writer of a book about sex worker's life and she knows the sex worker personally. The sex worker is pregnant and one day she gets labour pain. Saanvi along with Karna takes her to the hospital. The sex worker bears a baby girl and keeps the baby's name as Saanvi. Karna holds the baby and gets emotional. Saanvi always saw Karna as a fun, loving and cheerful guy. Seeing Karna as innocent and emotional Saanvi suggests Karna to discover his second half.

They become close friends and start to go out together. In the girl's hostel, girls were celebrating the final year students send-off party meanwhile even the boys enter the hostel and everyone starts to sing and dance. The boys leave the hostel, Saanvi and her friends decide to drink whereas Saanvi refuses to do so but due to her friends she sips a bit of vodka. While dancing Saanvi falls from the hostel rooms window and dies. Karna gets upset. Everyone starts to speak about Saanvi in the wrong way even Saanvi's father gets angry about Saanvi getting drunk. Seeing all this Karna gets angry and starts to beat his senior.

After three years Karna is in his final year, he becomes stubborn and rude. He is in the final year and Arya his junior doing her first year in electrical stream falls in love with Karna. Karna and his friends get apart due to fight and he forms another group.

Karna stands for the college election and also wins the election and becomes president of the college. Arya wants to change Karna. She wants to make Karna as he was in the first year of college. Arya and Karna go for a long drive where Karna and Arya do some mischievous things which brings smile on Karna's face. Arya takes Karna to Saanvi's house unknowingly. Karna sees Saanvi's parents and her photos in the house and gets emotional. Saanvi father apologizes for not trusting his daughter and thanks Karna for the diary which he gave after Saanvi's death. Saanvi's dad gives the diary to Karna and asks him to read it. Karna leaves the house and on his way he goes to the sex worker's house whom he and Saanvi had helped during her labour pain. Karna sees the sex workers child and gets emotional as her name is also Saanvi. Karna leaves the house and meets Arya, she tells him that he is lost in his past and asks him to come to the reality and leaves from there giving an emoji badge to him.

Karna gets stuck in Arya's words and leaves on bike to another place. Karna decides to sell the car which he and his friends bought in the first year and give the money for the sex worker's child's education. In his trip Karna learns that he is in love with Arya. He goes back to college. It was his final day in college. Karna writes two letters one to Arya and another one to Principal stating that he and his friends locked him in the car and blamed his other friends. In Arya's letter he writes that he loves her and wants to be with her. Karna and his friends get back together forming the same bond as first year. Principal forgives Karna and his friends without reading the letter. In the send off party Arya comes with the letter and tells Karna that he is really good human being and he accepted his mistake and asks him to give the letter to the Principal not to her. Everyone gets shocked and Karna realizes that he swapped the letter. Principal reads the letter and gets to know that Karna loves Arya, his daughter. In the end principal shouts at Karna.

Cast

 Rakshit Shetty as Karna
 Rashmika Mandanna as Saanvi Joseph
 Samyuktha Hegde as Aarya
 Achyuth Kumar as Ghouse
 Aravinnd Iyer as Lokesh Kumar
 Dhananjay Ranjan as Manjunath M.
 Ashwin Rao Pallaki as Ravi
 Shankar Murthy as Sankoch Murthy 
 Chandan Achar as Alexander Gabriel
 Pramod Shetty as Jnanesh
 Rajath Kumar as Rajath
 Manjunath Gowda
 Giri Krishna
 Raghu Ramanakoppa
 Hanumanthegowda as Dr. Thontadarya
 K. S. Sridhar
 Raghu Pandeshwar as Watchman Narayana
 Dinesh Mangaluru as Karna's Father
 Salman Ahamed as Poovaiah
 Sriharsha Mayya
 Raghavendra N.
 Aishwarya Acchappa as Bhagya
 Surabhi
 Neetha Muralidhar Rao
 Arohitha Gowda as Sonu
 Paramesh as Ranna

Production

Development

In February 2016, during the promotions of Ricky in Udupi, Rakshit Shetty announced that his next film would be Kirik Party and that Rishab Shetty, the director of the former, would again direct the film. He added that most of Ricky's crew would feature in the film except for Hariprriya, as the film demanded a "fresh female lead". He said that the film would be made in a budget of 4 crore. In an interview with The Times of India in December 2016, he said that he wrote the story about six years ago and was inspired from his "college experiences". He added, "Karna [his character in the film] is what I was like in college. He is actually a combination of mine and my best friends' characteristics. I was a naughty guy back then and have changed a lot since; I became serious after moving to Bengaluru".

Casting

Rashmika Mandanna told Indiatimes about her entry to cinema industry "The makers of Kirik Party saw a picture of mine from the Clean & Clear Fresh Face of India 2014 competition — one in which I was dancing during the college round — and approached me to act in the film. So, it really got things going. I always wanted to be in films. I would watch actors receiving awards and thanking their parents in their acceptance speeches — that is something that I always wanted to do. But I honestly didn't think that I would bag such a big movie. I would just say that I'm lucky."

Auditions were held in March 2016 for the two female leads and supporting roles in the film, in Bangalore. The makers auditioned over 400 girls and went through 2,000 profiles for the two lead roles. Rashmika Mandanna, then, a model and a student pursuing her graduation, was signed to play the first female lead in the film. She was selected after the makers "liked" the pictures from her win at the Clean & Clear Fresh Face of India 2014 competition. The second role went to Samyukta Hegde, then a 17-year-old, also pursuing her graduation. Post auditions for the supporting roles to play sidekicks to Rakshit Shetty's character in the film, seven short film makers, writers, dialogue writers and technicians — Aravind Iyer, Ashwin Rao Pallakki, Shankar Murthy, Dhananjay Ranjan, Chandan, Rajath Kumar and Giri Krishna — were signed. Pramod Shetty, who had previously worked with Rakshit, was also signed.

Filming 
Filming began on 17 April 2016 with a muhurat shot in Bangalore. It completed in September, with the final leg of the schedule filming a "journey song" for which the makers traveled to 15 places in four states of Karnataka, Andhra Pradesh, Maharashtra and Goa spanning 2,400 kilometers. A yellow Hindustan Contessa bearing the 3636 on the number plate was used in the film. Rishab Shetty conceived a mute character in the film and the car was used in the place after certain modifications. Elaborating on the role it plays in the film, he said, "It is not about just buying the car, but how they fall in love also makes this vehicle an important part of the film. The car even has a name, Kirik car." The makers spent over a month on finalizing on the "perfect car" before narrowing down on the Contessa "for its long looks". It was also used during the film's promotions following which it was auctioned to contribute for a "social cause".

Soundtrack

The film has ten tracks composed by B. Ajaneesh Loknath, out of which only six were included in the soundtrack album which initially released on 26 November 2016. The makers later released the remaining tracks as an extended album on 24 December 2016. The soundtrack had lyrics written by Rakshit Shetty, Dhananjay Ranjan, Kiran Kaverappa and Veeresh Shivamurthy. Deciding to not tie up with any music label, the producers released the album online under their own banner Paramvah Music, a subsidiary of Paramvah Studios and the digital partner Divo. The tracks received viral response from audiences.

Release
Kirik Party was released theatrically on 30 December 2016 across Karnataka. The subsequent days saw releases in Karnataka's neighbouring States of Kerala, and Tamil Nadu. However, this movie did not release in Andhra Pradesh and Telangana. Over the following month, it was released and saw strong opening in United States, Singapore, Dubai, Japan, Israel and parts of Europe. The strong opening at the domestic box-office was significant in that the film faced stiff competition from the hitherto already successful run of Hindi film Dangal. The film's television premiere took place in Colors Kannada on 20 August 2017.

Marketing
The trailer of the film was released by Kannada actor Upendra at Renukamba Preview Theater in Malleshwaram on 27 October 2016. In YouTube it garnered more than 3 lakh views within 48 hours of its launch, breaking the previous record for a Kannada film trailers. As of February 2017 it has crossed 2 million views on YouTube. The official app of Kirik Party was released on 20 December 2016 for Android.

Reception
The film opened to positive reviews from critics upon theatrical release. Writing for The Hindu, Archana Nathan called the film a "party down memory lane", further adding that "[t]here is an underlying theme of self-discovery that runs through the film" and also noting that "Ajaneesh Lokanath’s sound track plays a huge role in this narrative experience." Sunayana Suresh of The Times of India rated the film 4 out of 5, saying "Go ahead, watch this film and relive nostalgia from your college days." She further said that the film "scores high on technical values". Shashi Prasad of The Deccan Chronicle too rated 4/5 stars and wrote, "Both Rakshit and Rishab Shetty seem to have held onto the pulse of the new set of audience." He added, "If possible, take your college friends to watch this one for maximum fun and love." Noted critic Baradwaj Rangan writing on his blog said, "The must-haves of our cinema are all there. Romance. Comedy. Songs. Fights. But the director, Rishab Shetty, is stupendously inventive, and these generic elements acquire startlingly specific colours." He added "Forget La La Land. This is the most inventive musical of 2016."

Shyam Prasad of Bangalore Mirror rated 3.5/5 stars and wrote, "Director Rishab Shetty manages to derive lively and realistic performances from all actors. There is attention to detail but without forcing anything." A. Sharadhaa of The New Indian Express wrote that the film "portrays the happiness of youngsters’s life like never before in Kannada cinema" and added that it "touches the rainbow of experiences with sensibility, and does not waste much time, which is essentially the plus point of the film." She concluded by commending the performances of all the actors, alongside praising the film's music and camerawork. S. Viswanath of Deccan Herald called the film "a cacophonous campus tale spotlighting on the less appreciable aspects of students’ life." He wrote, "What is infuriating is that Rishab Shetty believes bunking classes, copying in exams, throwing tantrums at teachers and principal, whistling and wolfing at campus girls, invading hostels and downing pegs are meatier than the realistic depiction of what constitutes a student’s life" and added that "What actually ensures that one does not give up on Kirik Party is the brilliant acting of Rashmika Mandanna and Samyuktha Hegde."

Box office

Domestic 
The film collected  on its opening weekend which is recorded as one of the biggest openings in Kannada cinema. It also opened strongly in Kerala and Tamil Nadu. The New Indian Express reported that the film had "apparently made a business of []25 crore" after 25 days. By the end of 75 days, it collected  and still was being screened in over 100 cinemas.

The film went on to become one of the highest grossing ever film in Kannada film industry grossing over 35 crores.

Overseas
The film released on in United Arab Emirates 6 January 2017 in over 20 screens and collected  in three days, over the weekend. The overall gross had reached  by then. The film has performed strongly in the United States upon release on 1 February in over 60 screens after Jolly Hits acquired the distribution rights for overseas release. According to trade analyst, Taran Adarsh, the film collected 233,507 at the US box office in the first weekend, breaking the lifetime collections of RangiTaranga in the country in over just one weekend.

Accolades

Notes

References

External links
 
 Kirik Party Official App on Google Play

2016 films
2010s coming-of-age comedy-drama films
Indian coming-of-age comedy-drama films
Films set in universities and colleges
Films set in Bangalore
Films shot in Bangalore
Kannada films remade in other languages
2010s Kannada-language films
Films directed by Rishab Shetty